The sport of speedway in the United Kingdom has changed little since the first meetings in the 1920s. It has three domestic leagues, its own Speedway Grand Prix, and an annual entry into the Speedway World Cup / Speedway of Nations.

History
Several meetings have been claimed to be the first in the UK. The meeting at High Beech on 18 February 1928, a meeting organized by R.J. Hill-Bailey of the Ilford Motor Cycle Club which attracted an estimated 30,000 spectators, is often described as the first British speedway meeting. There were, however, also meetings in 1927 in Camberley in Surrey and Droylsden near Manchester. Despite being described as 'the first British Dirt Track meeting' at the time, the meeting at Camberley on 7 May 1927 differed in that the races were held in a clockwise direction. Races at Droylsden, the first held on 25 June 1927, were held in an anti-clockwise direction and this meeting appears to have a strong claim to be the first Speedway meeting in the UK, but it is generally accepted that the sport properly arrived in the UK when Australians Billy Galloway and Keith McKay arrived with the intention of introducing Speedway to the Northern Hemisphere. Both featured in the 1928 High Beech meeting.

It is probable however that the first speedway meeting in the UK to feature bikes with no brakes and broadsiding round corners on loose dirt, probably the main tests of real speedway, was the second meeting held at High Beech on 9 April, where Colin Watson, Alf Medcalf and 'Digger' Pugh demonstrated the art for the first time in Britain.

The sport boomed in the early days with new tracks opening in England, Scotland, and Wales. Notable pioneer venues of 1928 were Stamford Bridge and Celtic Park. The sport contracted in the early 1930s but revived just before the war. A few tracks, notably Belle Vue, Manchester operated in these dark days and the end of the war signalled activity at a number of tracks such as Perry Barr in Birmingham, Odsal Stadium in Bradford, Brough Park in Newcastle, Owlerton in Sheffield, Cleveland Park in Middlesbrough and White City in Glasgow. The World Championship of Speedway was staged at Wembley Stadium, London from 1936 to 1960.

A post war boom came to an end in the early 1950s thanks to television and Entertainment Tax but a revival with the advent of the Provincial League in 1960 has been largely sustained ever since.

Governing body
The Speedway Control Bureau  (SCB), in conjunction with the British Speedway Promoters' Association (BSPA), part of the Auto-Cycle Union who oversee all forms of track racing, govern the domestic leagues in the United Kingdom. International events are directly governed by the Fédération Internationale de Motocyclisme (FIM).

Green sheet averages
Green Sheet Averages are a list of riders Calculated Match Averages (CMA) issued or assessed periodically by the British Speedway Promoters' Association (BSPA) and are used to determine the riders averages for team building. They are called Green Sheet Averages as traditionally they are printed on green paper.

For both the SGB Premiership and SGB Championship there is a points limit in place for team building purposes. This points limit is created to prevent teams becoming too powerful, therefore creating a competitive league. All Elite League and Premier League teams must declare 7 riders before the start of the season. For the 2008 Elite League, the combined averages of the 7 riders must not have exceeded 38.85, which increased to 39.9 for the 2009 season. A 2008 Premier League team's combined average must not have exceeded 41.5, increasing to 42.5 the following season. At the start of a season, a rider retains their last recorded CMA (or assessed CMA if they have never previously established one) until they have competed in six home and six away matches. A new CMA is then issued that comes into effect seven days later.

Competitions
In the early days of speedway in the UK, meetings consisted of individual tournaments, scratch and handicap races. Team contests were introduced and became popular with supporters, leading to the introduction of the Southern Inter-track League (later the Southern League) in 1929, featuring teams of four riders competing over six heats, with two riders from each team in each heat. This soon changed to teams of six competing over nine heats and the scoring system of three points for a win, two for second, and one for third was introduced. 'Star' riders were initially banned from the league, but demand from supporters saw this rule relaxed. Northern tracks soon joined together to form the English Dirt Track League, but the league was beset with problems, with many fixtures not completed and several teams dropping out during the season. The following year it was renamed the Northern League.

The closure of several tracks led the remaining teams to come together in the National League, which continued as the main league until 1964, with a hiatus during World War II. In 1960 a group of promoters, dissatisfied with how the league was being run formed the Provincial League. This ran from 1960 to 1964. 1963 Provincial League champions Wolverhampton Wolves' refusal to accept promotion to the National League brought tensions to a head, with Provincial League teams threatened with suspension by the ACU. An RAC commission of enquiry led to the two leagues merging in 1965 to form the British League. Initially a single division, interest from new teams led to the creation of a second division in 1968. In 1975 this was renamed the New National League, the following year becoming the National League. In 1991 it reverted to the Division Two name and continued until 1994, after which the British League ended with the formation of the single-division Premier League. In 1997, with more teams wanting to join the league and to attract money from television coverage, the Elite League was formed as new top tier of ten teams, with the Premier League continuing as a second tier.

The need to develop new talent led to the creation of the British League Division Three in 1994, which became the Academy League in 1995, but proved to be financially unviable and in 1996 it was replaced with the amateur Conference League. This was renamed in 1997 as the British Amateur League, but it was replaced with a revised Conference League in 1998 which was not limited to amateurs and allowed Premier League riders with averages below 4.5 to compete. In 2009 the regulations were altered again and the Conference League was replaced by the National League, the third league to use that name.

Current Competitions

League
SGB Premiership
British Speedway's First Division
SGB Championship
British Speedway's Second Division
SGB National Development League
British Speedway's Third Division

Cup
SGB Premiership League Cup
The First Division League Cup Competition
SGB Championship Knockout Cup
The Second Division Knockout Cup Competition
SGB Championship Summer Trophy
The Second Division League Cup Competition
National League Knockout Cup
The Third Division Knockout Cup Competition

Pairs
SGB Premiership Pairs Championship
The Top Two Riders from each First Division Club, compete to become Pairs Champions
SGB Championship Pairs Championship
The Top Two Riders from each Second Division Club, compete to become Pairs Champions
National League Pairs Championship
The Top Two Riders from each Third Division Club, compete to become Pairs Champions

Individual
Speedway Grand Prix of Great Britain
The British round of the Speedway World Championship, held at the Principality Stadium
British Speedway Championship 
The top British Riders compete to become British Champion
British Speedway Under 21 Championship 
The top British Riders under the age of twenty-one compete to become British Under-21 Champion.
British Speedway Under 19 Championship 
The top British Riders under the age of nineteen compete to become British Under-19 Champion.
SGB Premiership Riders' Championship
Top riders from each First Division club compete to become Riders Individual Champion.
SGB Championship Riders' Championship 
Top riders from each Second Division club compete to become Riders Individual Champion. 
National League Riders' Championship 
Top riders from each Third club compete to become Riders Individual Champion.

Clubs

SGB Premiership
 Belle Vue Aces
 Ipswich Witches
 Kings Lynn Stars
 Peterborough Panthers - Current First Division Champions
 Sheffield Tigers
 Wolverhampton Wolves

SGB Championship
 Berwick Bandits
 Birmingham Brummies
 Edinburgh Monarchs
 Glasgow Tigers
 Leicester Lions
 Newcastle Diamonds
 Oxford Cheetahs
 Peterborough Panthers
 Plymouth Gladiators
 Poole Pirates - Current Second Division League & Knockout Cup Champions
 Redcar Bears
 Scunthorpe Scorpions

SGB National Development League
 Armadale Devils - The Junior Side for the Edinburgh Monarchs
 Belle Vue Colts  - The Junior Side for the Belle Vue Aces
 Berwick Bullets  - The Junior Side for the Berwick Bandits
 Kent Royals
 Leicester Lion Cubs  - The Junior Side for the Leicester Lions
 Mildenhall Fen Tigers - Current Third Division Champions
 Oxford Chargers  - The Junior Side for the Oxford Cheetahs
 Plymouth Centurions  - The Junior Side for the Plymouth Gladiators

Great Britain Speedway Team
The Great Britain Speedway Team is the National team of British Speedway – while Great Britain has always had a National Team competing on the World stage, a new era began in 2018 which saw a complete re-brand and new management structure unveiled.

The side compete in International Global Challenge Meetings, the Speedway of Nations and the Speedway World Cup. Great Britain are the current World Champions, winning the 2021 Speedway of Nations at The National Speedway Stadium in Manchester. It was Great Britain's first World Team Championship since 1989.

The current Captain is Tai Woffinden and the current Team Managers are Simon Stead & Oliver Allen

Former British Clubs

See also
London Riders' Championship
British Speedway Championship
Defunct British speedway teams

References

External links
BSPA homepage
speedwayworld.tv - Official site of Benfield Sports International (SGP and SWC rights holders)
Speedway British Grand Prix